Bezubaan is a 1982 Indian Hindi-language film directed by Bapu and produced by Pranlal Mehta. The film stars Shashi Kapoor, Reena Roy, Raj Kiran and Naseeruddin Shah. It is a remake of the Tamil film Mayangukiral Oru Maadhu. The film was a box office failure.

Plot
This is the story of a girl named Kalpana (Reena Roy), who stays in the women's hostel. She soon falls into wrong ways. She meets Raman and falls in love with him. She becomes pregnant and tries to commit suicide, but fails. Her roommate, Revati (Reeta Bhaduri), helps her out from this frustration. After some days, Kalpana marries Kumar (Shashi Kapoor), while Revati marries Shivnath (Naseruddin Shah). Kumar is a rich industrialist, whereas Shivnath is a struggling photographer. Shivnath soon starts blackmailing Kalpana, as he has photographs of Kalpana and Raman. In an accident, Kalpana gets injured and Raman, who is a taxi driver, helps her. Kalpana finally reveals everything to Kumar and Shivnath feels guilty for his act.

Cast

 Shashi Kapoor as Kumar 
 Reena Roy as Kalpana 
 Raj Kiran as Raman 
 Naseeruddin Shah as Shivnath 
 Rita Bhaduri as Revati aka Meera Bai 
 Seema Deo as Vidya 
 Iftekhar as Amarnath, Kalpana's Dad 
 Yunus Parvez as Seth Kalidas, Raman's Father 
 Murad as Mr. Khanna 
 Master Nadeem as Kumar and Kalpana's Son 
 Guddi Maruti as Kalpana's Friend

Music

References

External links

1982 films
1980s Hindi-language films
Films directed by Bapu
Films scored by Raamlaxman
Hindi remakes of Tamil films